The Elbtower is a planned high-rise building east of the HafenCity borough in Hamburg, Germany. At the time of the presentation of the mostly finalised design, on February 8, 2018, the Elbtower with its planned height of 245 meters would be by far the tallest conventional building in Hamburg, and the third tallest in Germany – after the Commerzbank Tower and the Messeturm (both in Frankfurt am Main). The design was developed by Christoph Felger who works at the office of English architect David Chipperfield, who has already realized a lower high-rise project in Hamburg, namely the Empire Riverside Hotel. The design was presented by Hamburg's then First Mayor Olaf Scholz as well as representatives of the HafenCity Hamburg GmbH and its investors.

Location 
The building is supposed to be built on a prominent urban site on the north bank of the Norderelbe river and thus mark the entrance to the inner city.  The site is bordered by several bridges crossing the Norderelbe. Construction is scheduled to begin in 2021  with a projected completion in 2025.

Architectural details 
The Elbtower covers a footprint approximately in the shape of an isosceles right triangle, with the hypotenuse of this triangle parallel to the shore of the Upper Harbor Canal to the northeast, while the legs are to the west and south.

The design consists of a comparatively large, four- to five-storey pedestal, on top of which the next six to seven floors are more and more recessed to form the base of a slender, approximately sixty-storey tower figure. The top eight floors of the tower once again take up the theme of flowing gradation, gradually dodging northeast. Due to the complex geometry of the structure, depending on the place of observation, different urban development effects will result.

History 
The Senate first presented the project in March 2017 at the MIPIM . According to estimates, the construction costs amount to 700 million euros.

Reception 
The project receives both support and opposition from the public and political representatives.

While the ruling SPD and the opposition parties CDU and FDP welcomed these plans, while the Greens expressed skepticism as coalition partner of the SPD.

Critics pointed out that the renovation and development of existing buildings such as the Heinrich Hertz Tower (Hamburg's TV tower) and the Bismarck monument should take precedence over new prestige projects.

The Senate responded to this criticism with the announcement of a transparent construction project and in particular a purely private financing of the project.

Further criticism refers to the more fundamental urban development question as to whether a skyscraper of the planned construction volume fits in with Hamburg's building tradition.

There are also concerns that the project – similar to other major local and national projects, such as the Elbphilharmonie, which opened about a year before the presentation of the draft – could, depending on the contractual details, put another huge financial burden on the city.

References 

Buildings and structures under construction in Germany
Buildings and structures in Hamburg-Mitte
David Chipperfield buildings